Hjalmar Fries Schwenzen (April 16, 1891 – December 14, 1973) was a Norwegian actor and theater director. He had his film debut in Pan in 1922.

Fries was employed at the National Theater in the 1920s, and he was the theater director at the Oslo New Theater from 1934 to 1935.

Hjalmar Fries was the brother of the actor Harald Schwenzen and screenwriter Per Schwenzen, and the father of the actress Gretelill Fries.

Filmography
1922: Pan
1924: Til sæters
1925: Himmeluret
1930: Kristine Valdresdatter
1931: Den store barnedåpen
1953: Den evige Eva
1953: Selkvinnen
1954: Heksenetter
1966: Nederlaget (TV)

References

External links
 

1891 births
1973 deaths
Norwegian male film actors
Norwegian male silent film actors
Male actors from Oslo
20th-century Norwegian male actors